Lü Peijian (born August 1928) is a Chinese retired politician and central banker. He served as Vice Minister of Finance from 1978 to 1982, Governor of the People's Bank of China from 1982 to 1985, and Auditor General of the National Audit Office from 1985 to 1994.

Biography 
Lü Peijian was born in August 1928 in Hongze, Jiangsu, Republic of China. During the Second Sino-Japanese War, he enlisted in the New Fourth Army in 1944 and joined the Communist Party of China in November of that year.

After the founding of the People's Republic of China in 1949, Lü worked in the finance department of the East China region. He was transferred to the Ministry of Finance in Beijing in 1953, and took correspondence courses in industrial economics at Renmin University of China from 1954 to 1956.

Lü rose through the ranks in the Ministry of Finance, and was appointed Vice Minister in 1978. In 1982, he was appointed the sixth Governor of the People's Bank of China, China's central bank. In March 1985 he became the second Auditor General of the National Audit Office (NAO), which had just been established two years earlier to systematically audit the accounts of businesses, government units, and individuals. In August 1985, Lü told the China Daily that the NAO had audited the accounts of more than 24,000 businesses and units, and uncovered tax evasion, fraud, and waste worth more than US$1.6 billion. He served as Auditor General until 1994. From May 1994 to June 2000, he served as Chairman of the Board of Supervisors of China Development Bank.

Lü was a member of the 12th, 13th, and 14th Central Committee of the Communist Party of China. He served as a Standing Committee member of the 9th Chinese People's Political Consultative Conference.

References 

1928 births
Living people
Governors of the People's Bank of China
Politicians from Huai'an
People's Republic of China politicians from Jiangsu
Members of the 12th Central Committee of the Chinese Communist Party
Members of the 13th Central Committee of the Chinese Communist Party
Members of the 14th Central Committee of the Chinese Communist Party
Renmin University of China alumni